Where's Huddles? is an American animated sitcom produced by Hanna-Barbera Productions that premiered on CBS on July 1, 1970. It ran for ten episodes as a summer replacement show for Hee Haw, until September 2.

It was similar in style to the studio's considerably more successful The Flintstones, and used several of the same essential voice actors and plots. Also, like The Flintstones, Where's Huddles? aired in the evening during prime time, had a laugh track, and had somewhat adult themes.  All ten episodes were produced and directed by William Hanna and Joseph Barbera.

The summer replacement was intended be a trial run for a full prime-time series, but only lasted for ten episodes. The episodes were repeated on the network's Sunday afternoon special in the summer of 1971.

Overview

The show's premise involved a professional football quarterback named Ed Huddles (voiced by Cliff Norton) and his neighbor, the team's center Bubba McCoy (voiced by Mel Blanc). They played for a team called the Rhinos. Other characters included Ed's wife Marge Huddles and the their daughter Pom-Pom, (voiced by Jean Vander Pyl their black teammate Freight Train (voiced by Herb Jeffries). Bubba's wife Penny McCoy was played by comedic actress Marie Wilson in her final role. The regular foil was Claude Pertwee (Paul Lynde), who lived alone with his cat Beverley and could tolerate the wives but considered the men to be "savages". His look and temperamental behavior are similar to Mr. Peevly from Help!... It's the Hair Bear Bunch!.

The Rhinos' football announcer was voiced by sportscaster Dick Enberg, who at the time was the voice of the Los Angeles Rams. Alan Reed had a recurring role as Mad Dog Maloney, the Rhinos' coach. The Huddles had a dog named Fumbles, voiced by Don Messick. Fumbles, much like Muttley, would often laugh at someone's misfortune, but whereas Muttley's laugh was wheezy in nature, Fumbles' laugh was more guttural. Most of the in-game action consisted of recycled animation (a shot of the team's running back side-kicking and stiff-arming defenders was one shot that was particularly frequently used).

Paul Lynde was credited for his role in this series as Claude Pertwee; this was unusual for Lynde, as he generally went uncredited in his other work for Hanna-Barbera at the time, which consisted mostly of Saturday morning cartoons (as opposed to Where's Huddles?, which aired in prime time). In addition to the Huddles television series, there was also a comic book (with art by Roger Armstrong) which ran for three issues from Gold Key/Whitman Comics in 1971.

Episodes

Season 1 (1970)

Home media
On July 26, 2016, Warner Archive released Where's Huddles?: The Complete Series on DVD in region 1 as part of their Hanna-Barbera Classics Collection. This is a Manufacture-on-Demand (MOD) release, available exclusively through Warner's online store.

References

External links
'"Where's Huddles?'' at Don Markstein's Toonopedia. Archived from the original on January 12, 2015.

1970s American adult animated television series
1970s American sitcoms
1970 American television series debuts
1971 American television series endings
American adult animated comedy television series
American adult animated sports television series
American animated sitcoms
CBS original programming
English-language television shows
Television series by Hanna-Barbera